Jonathan Wilford Lloyd (born 1956) is an Anglican priest.

Lloyd was born in 1956, educated at Lancing College, the University of Surrey, and ordained in 1991. He was at St Bartholomew, Sydenham until 1994 when he became the Bishop of Southwark's Officer for the Church in Society. He was the Chaplain Team Leader for the Diocese of Bath and Wells from 1997 to 2004 when he became Priest in charge of Charlcombe. He then served at Copenhagen and Brussels. He was Archdeacon of Germany and Northern Europe from 2010 to 2014. He is now Rector of St Stephen, West Vancouver.

Notes

1956 births
Alumni of the University of Surrey
Archdeacons of Germany and Northern Europe
Living people